The 2009–10 Taça de Portugal was the 70th season of the Taça de Portugal. The competition began on 30 August 2009, with the first round matches, and concluded with the final, held on 16 May at the Estádio Nacional, in Oeiras, between defending champions Porto and then Liga de Honra team Chaves. Porto won 2–1 to take their second consecutive cup, and assuring a place in play-off round of the 2010–11 UEFA Europa League.

Qualified teams
The following teams competed in the Taça de Portugal 2009–10:

16 teams of Liga Sagres:

16 teams of Liga Vitalis:

48 teams of Second Division (3rd level):

1Boavista forfeited the match.2Estrela da Amadora were disqualified from the competition.3Marítimo B are excluded for being a reserve team of Marítimo

91 teams of Terceira Divisão (4th level):

First round
In this round entered teams from Segunda Divisão (3rd level) and Terceira Divisão (4th level). A number of teams received a bye to the Second Round: Sertanense (III), Mineiro Aljustrelense (III), Camacha (III), Operário (III), Aliados do Lordelo (III), Tirsense (III), Esmoriz (III), Andorinha (IV), Lusitânia (IV), Atlético do Tojal (IV), Coimbrőes (IV), Alcochetense (IV), Mangualde (IV), 1º Dezembro (IV), Candal (IV), Alcaíns (IV), Machico (IV), Oliveira do Douro (IV), Mêda (IV) and Estrela da Calheta (IV). The matches will be played on August 30, 2009.

Note: Roman numerals in brackets denote the league tier the clubs participate in during the 2009–10 season.1Estrela da Amadora were disqualified from the competition.2Boavista forfeited the match.

Second round
In this round entered teams from Liga Vitalis (2nd level) and the winners from the first round. The matches were played on September 12 and 13, 2009.

|}

Third round
In this round entered teams from Liga Sagres (1st level) and the winners from the second round. The matches were played on October 17 and 18, 2009.

|}

Fourth round
The matches were played on 22 November 2009 and 2 January 2010.

|}

Fifth round
The matches were played on 20 and 24 January 2010.

|}

Quarter-finals
The matches were played on 2, 3 and 4 February 2010.

|}

Semi-finals

Final phase bracket
Teams that are listed first play at home in the first leg.

|}

First legs

Second legs

Final

Top scorers

Last updated: 27 January 2013

References

External links
Official webpage 
Official regulation 

2009-10
2009–10 domestic association football cups
2009–10 in Portuguese football